Henrik Ernst (born 2 September 1986) is a German footballer playing for ZFC Meuselwitz.

Ernst made his professional debut on 17 October 2009 when he came on for the final five minutes of Hannover 96's away game at Eintracht Frankfurt in the Bundesliga. However, most of his appearances have come for Hannover's reserve team, Hannover 96 II.

References

External links 
 
 

1986 births
Living people
German footballers
Hannover 96 players
Hannover 96 II players
RB Leipzig players
Bundesliga players
Association football midfielders
3. Liga players
Regionalliga players
Footballers from Hanover